Driven is a 1998 American drama film written and directed by Michael Paradies Shoob and starring Tony Todd, Daniel Roebuck, Whip Hubley and Chad Lowe.

Cast
Tony Todd as Darius Pelton
Whip Hubley as Jason Schuyler
Daniel Roebuck as Dale Schneider
Chad Lowe as LeGrand
Diane Dilascio as Rachel
Xander Berkeley as J.D. Johnson
Lou Rawls as Charlie
Eric Pierpoint as Hal
Lee Garlington as Marian
Rawle D. Lewis as Soup
Richard Riehle as Leo
Lesley Woods as Iron Gray
Susan Parker as Desiree, the Blind Woman
Spencer Garrett as Business Man #1
Anthony Palermo as Businessman #2
Joseph Culp as Chiropractic Assistant

Release
The film aired on KCET on April 22, 1998.

Reception
Todd McCarthy of Variety gave the film a mixed review, calling it "Dramatic but not entirely credible."

David Kronke of the Los Angeles Times gave the film a positive review and wrote that it "possesses a verve and brooding atmosphere all its own."

References

External links